Limestone is an unincorporated community in Marshall County, West Virginia, United States.

The community was named for deposits of limestone near the original town site.

References

Unincorporated communities in Marshall County, West Virginia
Unincorporated communities in West Virginia